Jumbo Peak is a  volcanic mountain summit located in the Gifford Pinchot National Forest, in Skamania County of Washington state. Its nearest higher neighbor is Sunrise Peak,  to the north-northeast. Precipitation runoff from Jumbo Peak drains into tributaries of the Cowlitz River drainage basin. The Juniper Ridge Trail (#261) which skirts this peak provides access to this remote peak.

Geology

The history of the formation of the Cascade Mountains dates back millions of years ago to the late Eocene Epoch. With the North American Plate overriding the Pacific Plate, episodes of volcanic igneous activity occurred. Due to Mount St. Helens' proximity to Jumbo Peak, volcanic ash is common in the area. Jumbo Peak is composed of Pliocene-Miocene andesitic magma that intruded up into older volcanic rocks more than five million years ago and is now surrounded by a forest of old-growth Douglas fir and mountain hemlock.

Climate

Jumbo Peak is located in the marine west coast climate zone of western North America. Most weather fronts originate in the Pacific Ocean, and travel northeast toward the Cascade Mountains. As fronts approach, they are forced upward by the peaks of the Cascade Range (Orographic lift), causing them to drop their moisture in the form of rain or snowfall onto the Cascades. As a result, the west side of the Cascades experiences high precipitation, especially during the winter months in the form of snowfall. During winter months, weather is usually cloudy, but due to high pressure systems over the Pacific Ocean that intensify during summer months, there is often little or no cloud cover during the summer.

See also

 Geology of the Pacific Northwest
 Dark Divide
 List of mountain peaks of Washington (state)

References

External links

 Weather forecast: Jumbo Peak
 National Forest Service: Gifford Pinchot National Forest
 Hiking Jumbo Peak: Washington Trails Association

Cascade Range
Mountains of Skamania County, Washington
Mountains of Washington (state)
North American 1000 m summits